Doreen Southwood (born 1974) is a South African artist, designer, and boutique owner based in Cape Town. She works in a wide variety of media in her artwork, producing sculptures, objects, prints, film, and more, which she often bases on personal experiences and self exploration. Her candidness regarding personal flaws and the cycles of repression and coping that accompany conservative, middle class, Afrikaans upbringing inform much of her work, calling attention to ways in which women are silenced or otherwise repressed in that space.

In 2003, Southwood was named the overall winner of the Brett Kebble Art Awards for her painted bronze sculpture, "The Swimmer." The sculpture featured a young woman gazing blankly ahead as she stands on the end of a diving board. For this award, Southwood received R100,000, at that time the largest award for a single artwork in South African history.

Her work has been exhibited in Senegal, Cuba, New York City, and across South Africa.

In 2001 she opened a shop in Cape Town called Mememe, which seeks to make the work of African fashion designers available to the public. Another Mememe shop opened in Johannesburg in 2011. Southwood's own designs have been featured in fashion weeks in Johannesburg and Cape Town  and are known for embodying features of the feminine and nostalgic.

Career

Education
Southwood received her B.A. in Fine Arts from the University of Stellenbosch in 1998.

Exhibitions

2010
 CURRENT MATTERS, The Gallery, Grande Provence, Franshoek
 TWENTY, South African Sculpture of the last Two Decades, Nirox Sculpture Park, Cradlle of Humankind, Gauteng
 1910-2010: From Pierneef to Gugulective, Iziko South African National Gallery, Cape Town
2009	
 SING INTO MY MOUTH, What if the world, Cape Town
 Audi JO'BURG Fashion Week, Sandton Convention centre 
2008	
 ZA: GIOVANNE ARTE DEL SUDAFRICA, Palazzo delle Papesse, Siena, Italy
 VIRGIN MOBILE CAPE TOWN FASHION week, Cape Town
2007	
 SUMMER 2007/08, Michael Stevenson Gallery, Cape Town
 SPIER CONTEMPORARY, Spier Estate, Stellenbosch
2006	
 ALTERNATIVE CLOTHES workshop, Havanna Biennale, Cuba
 PERSONAL AFFECTS: Power and Poetics in South African Art, The Contemporary Museum, Honolulu
 WOMAN: Photography and New Media, Jo'burg
2005	
 IN THE MAKING: materials and process, Michael Stevenson Gallery, Cape Town
 UNIVERSE OF ME, Michael Stevenson Gallery, Cape Town
 SYNERGY, Iziko National Gallery, Cape Town
2004	
 DEMOCRACY AND CHANGE, Klein Karoo Nasionale Kunstefees, Oudshorn
 DAKART Biennial, Dakar, Senegal
 FORTY/VEERTIG, Sasol Museum Stellenbosch
 PERSONAL AFFECTS, Power and Poetics in Contemporary South African Art, Museum for African Art, New York City
 A DECADE OF DEMOCRACY: South African art 1994-2004 from the permanent collection, South African National Gallery, Cape Town
2003	
 KAROO NASIONALE KUNSTEFEES, Untitled (solo exhibition)
 BRETT KEBELE ART AWARDS Finalists Exhibition, Cape Town
2002	
 BELLVILLE ARTS ASSOCIATION, ABSA Atelier
 SELF, Klein Karoo Nasionale Kunstefess, Oudshorn
 JUST PERFECT, Spark Gallery, Jo'burg
 BELL ROBRTS GALLERY, Nothing really matters, Cape Town

References

Bibliography

External links
MeMeMe boutique
Design Indaba profile

1974 births
Living people
Artists from Cape Town
21st-century South African women artists
Stellenbosch University alumni